Periodic acid is the highest oxoacid of iodine, in which the iodine exists in oxidation state +7. It can exist in two forms: orthoperiodic acid, with the chemical formula , and metaperiodic acid, which has the formula .

Periodic acid was discovered by Heinrich Gustav Magnus and C. F. Ammermüller in 1833.

Synthesis
Modern industrial scale production involves the oxidation of a solution of sodium iodate under alkaline conditions, either electrochemically on a  anode, or by treatment with chlorine:

  (counter ions omitted for clarity)  E° = -1.6 V

Orthoperiodic acid can be dehydrated to give metaperiodic acid by heating to 100 °C under reduced pressure.

Further heating to around 150 °C gives iodine pentoxide rather than the expected anhydride diiodine heptoxide. Metaperiodic acid can also be prepared from various orthoperiodates by treatment with dilute nitric acid.

Properties
Orthoperiodic acid has a number of acid dissociation constants. The pKa of metaperiodic acid has not been determined.

, pKa = 3.29

, pKa = 8.31

, pKa = 11.60

There being two forms of periodic acid, it follows that two types of periodate salts are formed. For example, sodium metaperiodate, NaIO4, can be synthesised from HIO4 while sodium orthoperiodate, Na5IO6 can be synthesised from H5IO6.

Structure
Orthoperiodic acid forms monoclinic crystals (space group P21/n) consisting of a slightly deformed  octahedron interlinked via bridging hydrogens. Five I–O bond distances are in the range 1.87–1.91 Å and one I–O bond is 1.78 Å.
The structure of metaperiodic acid also includes  octahedra, however these are connected via cis-edge-sharing with bridging oxygens to form one-dimensional infinite chains.

Reactions

Like all periodates periodic acid can be used to cleave various 1,2-difunctional compounds. Most notably periodic acid will cleave vicinal diols into two aldehyde or ketone fragments (Malaprade reaction).

This can be useful in determining the structure of carbohydrates as periodic acid can be used to open saccharide rings. This process is often used in labeling saccharides with fluorescent molecules or other tags such as biotin. Because the process requires vicinal diols, periodate oxidation is often used to selectively label the 3′-termini of RNA (ribose has vicinal diols) instead of DNA as deoxyribose does not have vicinal diols.

Periodic acid is also used as an oxidising agent of moderate strength, as exemplified in the Babler oxidation of secondary allyl alcohols which are oxidised to enones by stoichiometric amounts of orthoperiodic acid with catalyst PCC.

Other oxyacids
Periodate is part of a series of oxyacids in which iodine can assume oxidation states of −1, +1, +3, +5, or +7. A number of neutral iodine oxides are also known.

See also 
Compounds with a similar structure:
 Perchloric acid, perbromic acid, the related perhalogenic acids
 Telluric acid and perxenic acid, the isoelectronic oxoacids of tellurium and xenon

Compounds with similar chemistry:
 lead tetraacetate (Criegee oxidation)

References

Hydrogen compounds
Halogen oxoacids
Iodine compounds
Oxidizing acids
Oxidizing agents
Periodates